East New Guinea Highlands is a 1960 proposal by Stephen Wurm for a family of Papuan languages spoken in Papua New Guinea that formed part of his 1975 expansion of Trans–New Guinea.

History of classification
The original proposal consisted of West-Central (Engan), Central (Chimbu–Wahgi), East-Central (Goroka), and Eastern (Kainantu). Duna and Kalam were added in 1971. East New Guinea Highlands was broken up by Malcolm Ross in his 2005 classification (see below), but all branches were retained, and all remain within the now expanded Trans–New Guinea. This language grouping should not be confused with the East Papuan languages, a separate hypothesis.

Family division
 Wiru isolate
 Kenati isolate
 Duna–Pogaya family
 Kalam family: Gants, Kalam-Kobon, Tai
 Eastern (Kainantu) family
 Oweina language
 Kambaira language
 Tairora branch: Binumarien, South Tairoa, North Tairoa, Waffa
 Gapsup branch: Agarabi, Awiyaana, Awa, Gadsup, Kosena, Ontenu, Usarufa
 Central (Chimbu–Wahgi) family
 Chimbu branch: Chuave, Dom, Golin, Kuman, Nomane, Salt-Yui, Sinasina
 Hagen branch
 Melpa (Medlpa) language
 Kaugel languages: Imbongu, Mbo-Ung, Umbu-Ungu
 Jimi branch: Maring, Narak, Kandawo
 Wahgi branch: Nii, Wahgi, North Wahgi
 East-Central (Goroka) family
 Gende language
 Fore branch: Fore, Gimi
 Gahuku branch: Dano (Upper Asaro), Benabena, Alekano (Gahuku), Tokano (Lower Asaro)
 Siane branch: Siane, Yaweyuha
 Kamono-Yagaria branch: Kamono, Inoke-Yate, Kanite, Keyagana, Yagaria
 West-Central (Engan) family
 Huli language
 Enga proper: Enga, Nete, Ipili, Lembena, Bisorio
 Angal-Kewa branch: Kyaka, Angal, Angal Heneng (Katinja), Angal Enen, Samberigi (Sau), West Kewa, East Kewa, Erave

Ross classified each of the families in bold as a separate branch of TNG, with the exceptions of Kainantu and Goroka, which he kept together; Kalam, which he linked to the Rai Coast family; and Kenati, which he had insufficient data to classify but which has since been associated with Kainantu.

Ross believes that these languages lie near the homeland of proto–Trans New Guinea.

See also
 Trans–New Guinea languages

References

Languages of Papua New Guinea
Trans–New Guinea languages
Proposed language families